Shao Tianfa (born 4 May 2001) is a Chinese footballer currently playing as a midfielder for Beijing Guoan.

Career statistics

Club
.

References

2001 births
Living people
Chinese footballers
Association football midfielders
Beijing Guoan F.C. players